The Porter County Museum (PoCo Muse) is located at 20 Indiana Avenue, Valparaiso, Indiana.

From May 11, 1975 until March 12, 2020 the museum was located in the old Porter County Jail and sheriffs residence, located at 153 Franklin Street Valparaiso, Indiana, across the street from its current home. The jail was added to the National Register of Historic Places in 1976.  The museum was founded in 1916 by the Porter County Historical Society (now the PoCo Muse Foundation), the PoCo Muse is the oldest institution devoted to the history and culture of Porter County, Indiana.

Artifacts were displayed in the lower level of the Valparaiso Public Library from 1916 until 1937, on the top floor of the Porter County Courthouse from 1938 until 1973, and inside the 1871 Porter County Jail and Sheriff’s Residence from 1975 until 2020. Currently The PoCo Muse is located across from two of its pervious homes at 20 Indiana Avenue in downtown Valparaiso.

Gallery

Bibliography
"Counties of Porter and Lake Indiana", Weston A. Goodspeed, Historical Editor and Charles Blanchard, Biographical Ed.; F.A. Battey & Co. 1883; Chapter, "History of Porter County", pg 23
"History of Porter County", Volume I, Then Lewis Publishing Co; Chicago-New York; 1912, pp. 58–59.

Footnotes

 Mullins, Lanette; Images of America; Valparaiso – Looking Back, Moving Forward; Arcadia Publishing; Chicago, Illinois; 2002
 Neeley, George E.; City of Valparaiso, A Pictorial History; G. Bradley Publishing, Inc.; St. Louis, Missouri; 1989 
 Porter County Interim Report, Indiana Historic Sites and Structures Inventory; Historic Landmarks Foundation of Indiana; July 1991

External links

 1871 Porter County Jail - official site

Buildings and structures in Valparaiso, Indiana
Houses in Porter County, Indiana
National Register of Historic Places in Porter County, Indiana
Italianate architecture in Indiana
Government buildings completed in 1871
Prison museums in Indiana
Museums in Porter County, Indiana
Jails on the National Register of Historic Places in Indiana
Jails in Indiana
Houses on the National Register of Historic Places in Indiana